Robert Harry Kuykendall, also known as Bobby Dall (born November 3, 1963), is an American musician best known as the bassist for the multi-platinum selling rock band Poison.
The band has sold over 50 million albums worldwide and has sold 15 million records in the United States alone. The group has also charted ten singles to the Top 40 of the Billboard Hot 100, including six Top 10 singles and the Hot 100 number-one, "Every Rose Has Its Thorn".

Dall had ambitions of studying law, but ultimately turned to music instead. He began playing guitar but switched to bass at the age of 15. Dall later moved to Los Angeles with Bret Michaels, Rikki Rockett, and Matt Smith to play with the band Paris, which later became known as Poison.

Personal life
Dall is the youngest of three children. He lived in Palm Bay, Florida with his family from the age of 9 to age 17, but relocated to Harrisburg when he was still young. Dall currently resides in Indialantic, Fl. 

Dall has two children: Zachary Brandon (born December 16, 1990) and Zoe Brianne (born January 9, 1997).

Band incident
During a Poison show in Atlanta on August 25, 2006, Dall and Bret Michaels had to be separated by members of the road crew and the rest of the band after the two came to blows right before the encore, with Michaels throwing his mic at Dall, and Dall retaliating by slamming his bass into Michaels, injuring his knee. Michaels apologized later and stated, "You may have just seen the last concert by Poison in its current formation." The altercation happened before the band's set ended with "Talk Dirty To Me." After some tense moments and Michaels' apology to the crowd including his explanation that "like brothers, sometimes you have to air things out," the band did finish the set. Dall left the stage immediately.

There have been many physical conflicts within the band over the years, but this altercation was the first onstage incident since the fistfight between Michaels and Poison guitarist C.C. Deville at the MTV Video Music Awards in 1991, although that took place after the performance, not during.  The band took time out while Michaels continued with his solo tour.

Discography

Poison
Look What the Cat Dragged In (1986)
Open Up and Say...Ahh! (1988)
Flesh & Blood (1990)
Swallow This Live (1991)
Native Tongue (1993)
Poison's Greatest Hits: 1986-1996 (1996)
Crack a Smile...and More! (2000)
Power to the People (2000)
Hollyweird (2002)
 Best of Ballads & Blues (2003)
The Best of Poison: 20 Years of Rock (2006)
Poison'd (June 2007)
Live, Raw & Uncut (2008)
Seven Days Live CD (2008)
Poison - Box Set (Collector's Edition) (2009)
Double Dose: Ultimate Hits (2011)

References

External links
Official Poison website

1963 births
20th-century American bass guitarists
20th-century American male musicians
American heavy metal bass guitarists
American male bass guitarists
American rock bass guitarists
Glam metal musicians
Living people
Musicians from Harrisburg, Pennsylvania
Poison (American band) members
People from Mechanicsburg, Pennsylvania